Manon Arcangioli (born 28 August 1994) is a French professional tennis player.

On 2 March 2015, she reached her best singles ranking of world No. 268. On 18 June 2018, she reached her best WTA doubles ranking of No. 189. Up to date, she has won eight singles and 15 doubles titles on the ITF Circuit.

Career
Arcangioli made her Grand Slam singles main-draw debut at the 2015 French Open thanks to a wildcard, and she lost in the first round to the unseeded American Irina Falconi in straight sets.

Grand Slam performance timelines

Singles

Doubles

ITF Circuit finals

Singles: 15 (8 titles, 7 runner-ups)

Doubles: 35 (15 titles, 20 runner–ups)

References

External links
 
 

1994 births
Living people
French female tennis players
Sportspeople from Rouen
People from Lillebonne
Sportspeople from Seine-Maritime